Kalinga Cup (also known as All India Kalinga Cup) is an Indian association football tournament held in Odisha and organised by Football Association of Odisha and Department of Sports and Youth of Government of Odisha annually. The tournament was first started in 1962 by former chief minister Biju Patnaik.

Venue 
The matches are held at Barabati Stadium, Cuttack, Odisha.

Awards

Results

References 

Football cup competitions in India
Football in Odisha
1962 establishments in India
Recurring sporting events established in 1962